The second government of Carlos Arias Navarro was formed on 12 December 1975, following the latter's confirmation as Prime Minister of Spain by King Juan Carlos I on 5 December, as a result of his enthronement as the new head of state of Spain following dictator Francisco Franco's death on 20 November 1975.

Arias Navarro's second cabinet was the first to serve under the restored monarchy of Spain, and was made up of members from the National Movement (which comprised the FET y de las JONS—the only legal political party during the Francoist regime—the military and aligned-nonpartisan figures from the civil service), but would also see the incorporation of members from legal associations, societies and groups—not yet political parties—such as Manuel Fraga's Federation of Independent Studies (FEDISA), the Spanish People's Union (UDPE) and the Spanish Democratic Union (UDE). Further, the death of Franco would see amendments in the regulations of the Cortes Españolas that would allow legislators to group into parliamentary factions, with one such faction, the Independent Parliamentary Group (GPI), being also present in the government through the figure of Rodolfo Martín Villa.

Proving incapable of adapting to the coming changes and reluctant to democratize the regime, Arias Navarro would submit his resignation as prime minister on 1 July 1976. In accordance with the legal provisions within the Organic Law of the State, the cabinet remained in place with Deputy Prime Minister Fernando de Santiago as acting prime minister until the appointment of Adolfo Suárez a few days later, with all ministers being automatically dismissed upon the election of the new prime minister.

Council of Ministers
The Council of Ministers was structured into the offices for the prime minister, the three deputy prime ministers and 20 ministries, including one minister without portfolio.

Notes

References

Bibliography

External links
Governments. Juan Carlos I (20.11.1975 ...). CCHS-CSIC (in Spanish).
Governments of Spain 1975–1977. Ministers of Carlos Arias Navarro and Adolfo Suárez. Historia Electoral.com (in Spanish).
The governments of the Transition (1975–1977). Lluís Belenes i Rodríguez History Page (in Spanish).
Biographies. Royal Academy of History (in Spanish).

1975 establishments in Spain
1976 disestablishments in Spain
Cabinets established in 1975
Cabinets disestablished in 1976
Council of Ministers (Spain)